The 67th Infantry Division (67-ya Pekhotnaya Diviziya) was an infantry formation of the Russian Imperial Army.

Organization
1st Brigade
265th Infantry Regiment
266th Infantry Regiment
2nd Brigade
267th Infantry Regiment
268th Infantry Regiment
67th Artillery Brigade

References

Infantry divisions of the Russian Empire